Jose Manuel Nieto (1734–1804) was a soldier from the Presidio of San Diego who was assigned to the Mission San Gabriel at the time his land was granted by the Spanish Empire in 1784.

Spanish soldier
Nieto was a mulatto, born in Sinaloa, Mexico in 1734. He came to Alta California with the Gaspar de Portolà expedition of 1769. He served in the Royal Army in the province of Alta California. Jose Manuel Perez-Nieto was first mentioned as a soldier of the Presidio of Monterey, in 1773.

Rancho Los Nietos
Presidio soldiers were permitted to raise cattle for food and make a small profit. As his cattle numbers increased, the need for more grazing land was required. In 1784, he was granted a provisional grant of the land that would become Rancho Los Nietos by Pedro Fages, the governor of Alta California.

Nieto retired from duty and settled down on his rancho with his family. A small community called Los Nietos gradually built up around the Nietos adobe home, which was near the Indian village of Sejat on the San Jose Creek. Today, the area of West Whittier-Los Nietos, California is located near the original rancho home site.

Upon Manuel's death, his rancho was inherited by his widow and four children.

Descendants
He married Maria Teresa Morillo.

References

1734 births
1804 deaths
Californios